Sterling Haskel "Hack" Ayers (February 10, 1936 – January 8, 2020) was an American auctioneer and politician in the state of Tennessee. Ayers served in the Tennessee House of Representatives from 1967 to 1968. A Republican, he represented the 9th district (Campbell County, Tennessee and Scott County, Tennessee). Residing in LaFollette, Tennessee, Ayers was an auctioneer, furniture dealer, and real estate broker. He was the founder of Ayers Auction & Real Estate in LaFollette and was a former president of the National Auctioneers Association. He was also a member of the NAA Hall of Fame. Ayers died in 2020 at the age of 83.

References

1936 births
2020 deaths
Republican Party members of the Tennessee House of Representatives
People from LaFollette, Tennessee
Businesspeople from Tennessee
American auctioneers